Ren Jiaqing (born August 9, 1957) is an assistant coach and a former Chinese football player. His last appointment was as the assistant coach at Chinese Super League side Changchun Yatai.

References

1957 births
Living people
Chinese football managers
Chinese footballers
Footballers from Beijing
Beijing Guoan F.C. players
Association football defenders